Dilwale may refer to:

 Dilwale (1994 film), a 1994 Bollywood film starring Ajay Devgn and Sunil Shetty
 Dilwale (2015 film), a 2015 Bollywood film starring Shah Rukh Khan, Kajol, Varun Dhawan, and Kriti Sanon

See also
Dilwala, 2013 Indian film